Through the Embers of Chaos: Balkan Journeys is a nonfiction book by Irish author Dervla Murphy, detailing her travels through the Balkans. It was first published by John Murray in 2002.

Critical reception
Steve Crawshaw of The Independent panned the book, particularly Murphy's repeated "reluctance to address context". The Guardians Matthew Collin noted that Murphy's likability makes it easier for readers to get through the book's "relentless barrage of facts, acronyms and grim vignettes". In a review for the Library Journal, Melinda Stivers Leach praised the book as "both highly educational and deeply inspiring". The Irish Times Owen Dawson also gave the book a positive review, concluding: "This is Murphy at her best  entertaining, observant, informed and, above all else, thoroughly human."

References

External links
 

2002 non-fiction books
John Murray (publishing house) books
Books by Dervla Murphy